Export variants of Soviet military equipment were versions of Soviet military equipment (armored vehicles, airplanes, missiles) of significantly inferior capability to the original designs and intended only for export.  Monkey model was the unofficial designation given by the Soviet Military to such variants.  The monkey model was exported with the same or a similar designation as the original Soviet design but in fact it lacked many of the advanced or expensive features of the original.

Monkey-model weaponry was used mainly by non-communist Soviet allies, such as Egypt, Iraq and Syria.  Eastern Bloc states such as the Warsaw Pact countries and other Communist allies such as Cuba and Vietnam generally used fully capable versions of Soviet weaponry, although poorer states often used earlier generations of weapons.

The term monkey model was popularized in the West by Viktor Suvorov, in Inside the Soviet Army.  Suvorov states that the simplified monkey model was designed for massive production in wartime, to replace front-line stocks if a war should last for several weeks. In peacetime, Soviet industry gained experience building both standard and export-model variants, the latter being for sale "to the 'brothers' and 'friends' of the USSR as the very latest equipment available."  He also cites the benefit of disinformation when an exported monkey model fell into the hands of Western intelligence, who "naturally gained a completely false impression of the true combat capabilities of the BMP-1  and of Soviet  tanks" .

Armored vehicles

Monkey-model tanks were equipped with downgraded fire control systems, downgraded armor, no NBC system, and provided with substandard ammunition. (Their ballistic computers, range finders, and night vision were inferior to those found on production models)

For instance, the 3BM17 APFSDS 125 mm smoothbore ammunition were designed specifically for export, and had a penetration of sloped armor at 2000 m that was inferior to the original Soviet model, the 3BM15. By the time of the Gulf War, both rounds were obsolescent and relegated solely to training purposes (not actual combat). For 3rd world client states, however, they were the most advanced 125mm KE rounds available.

Aircraft

Monkey-model aircraft were downgraded in a manner similar to that of tanks. The MiG-23 MS 'Flogger-E', for example, was an export variant the original MiG 23 developed because the MiG 23 was considered too advanced to be exported to Third World countries. The 'Flogger-E' lacked the most advanced features of the original. Infra-red search and track and beyond visual range missile capabilities were removed and its avionics suite was very basic. This variant was widely sold during the 1970s to Soviet allies in the Middle East.

Effectiveness of monkey models
It is claimed by some that most Soviet-designed tanks and aircraft engaged by western forces during the last decades were allegedly monkey models, and that this must be kept in mind when trying to assess the capabilities of real Soviet-era equipment versus those of contemporary western designs. An alleged example of this is the dismal performance of Iraqi T-72 models during the 1991 Gulf War and the 2003 invasion of Iraq.

In each conflict, Iraqi T-72s failed to destroy a single M1 Abrams tank, even after scoring direct hits. On the other hand, a publication from the early 80s claims that the 125 mm 2A46 gun "will penetrate the armor of any current or future NATO tank at ranges greater than 2,000 meters." A decade later, Robert H. Scales insisted that the 125mm gun "could penetrate the Abrams (frontal armor) at 1,000 meters," provided it was using modern ammunition.  The performance discrepancy can be explained by the fact that the Iraqi's used substandard ammunition for their guns, while operating a mix of monkey models and their own locally produced variant, the Lion of Babylon.

See also

History of the tank
List of Soviet tanks
Soviet Army

References

Sources
 Milsom, John (1975). Russian Tanks, 1900-1970: The Complete Illustrated History of Soviet Armoured Theory and Design. Galahad Books. .
 
 Zaloga, Steven et al. (1993). T-72 Main Battle Tank 1974-1993. Oxford: Osprey. .
 Inside the Soviet Army. http://militera.lib.ru/research/suvorov12/06.html
 Armed Forces Journal International - Volume 118.
 

Export
Weapons of the Soviet Union
Foreign relations of the Soviet Union
Foreign trade of the Soviet Union
Weapons trade